The Holy Corner (English for the Oud begijnhof) or Old Saint Elisabeth is a beguinage in Ghent, Belgium. It is one of three beguinages in the city – the other two are the new Saint Elisabeth beguinage in the suburb of Sint-Amandsberg and Our Lady Ter Hooyen in the Lange Violettenstraat. Both Saint Elisabeth beguinages were named after Elisabeth of Hungary, also known as Saint Elisabeth of Thuringia.

Location 

Holy Corner is a protected urban heritage site. It is now a largely urban neighbourhood in the northeast of Ghent, close to the Rabot (originally a Spanish fortification, now a Ghent neighbourhood as well), between the Burgstraat and the Begijnhoflaan.

Holy Corner can easily be reached by general transport. Since its newest addition is the Russian Orthodox church, it is notable that tram 4, the quickest connection from Ghent railway station, has as its final destination the Ghent neighbourhood of Moscou.

History 

In the 13th century, a number of devout, unmarried and lay women, who had been helping the Cistercian sisters with their medical work, were given their own premises by Countess Joanna of Constantinople, daughter to Baldwin IX of Flanders, who also helped with the construction of the Hospital in Lille named after her (L'hospice de la Comtesse Jeanne, built in 1236).

The beguinage constructed in 1234, and soon named after Saint-Elisabeth who was canonized in 1236, grew into a little town of its own, with a church, a "Grootjuffer" house, an infirmary (with its own chapel), 18 convents, a big laundry meadow (used by the beguines who took in laundry of rich Ghent inhabitants) and a large orchard.

During the French Revolution, the city of Ghent acquired the property rights to the beguinage (on the legal provision of having to subsidize and maintain it). This actually happened to all church property in Belgium, but as the beguinage was not solely an area used for religious activities, the city of Ghent repeatedly tried to incorporate it in new development, as Ghent was experiencing the effects of the Industrial revolution and needed cheap housing for its increasing working force.

After a number of beguines voluntarily settled in a new beguinage at Our Lady Ter Hoyen, the conflict between the Saint Elisabeth beguinage and the town administration dominated by the liberal party became intense. Thanks to financial sponsoring by the Duke of Arenberg (also known as the Prinz von Recklinghausen) in two years' time (1872–1874) a new beguinage was built at the then still independent village of Sint-Amandsberg. On September 29, 1874, more than 600 beguines left Ghent for Sint-Amandsberg, in carriages provided by the Ghent Roman Catholic aristocracy.

After 1874 

After the departure of the beguines, the beguinage became a social housing area. There was less investment in infrastructure and accommodation and the area became a prime example of urban decay.

However, in the 20th century, some voices started to be heard that clamoured for the preservation of this unique urban site. Thanks to this, both private enterprise and the town of Ghent started to invest more into local housing, and from 1984 on the neighbourhood even began to feel the effects of gentrification. As often, artists were the first to come here: Constant Permeke, Albert Servaes and Frits Van den Berghe all once lived at Van Akenstraat, 7 (but not simultaneously).

In English, the neighbourhood is commonly known as "Holy Corner". The name was originally coined by the late local Church of England vicar, Cameron Walker, who was of Scottish descent, and who with this name may have hinted at Holy Corner in Edinburgh. At the time, the neighbourhood was the location of four churches of four different nominations: the Roman Catholic Saint Elisabeth Church, which was originally the beguinage church, the Eastern Orthodox Church of Saint Andrew, the Protestant Rabot Church and the Saint John's Anglican Church. The four churches share an Ecumenical Whitsun walk. Though the area has been largely gentrified, on Sunday mornings practically every European and African language can be heard in its streets, since many Russians, Greeks, Ukrainians, Romanians, Serbs, Ethiopians, ... come to worship at the Orthodox Church, the Anglican church attracts Africans (and some other Christian foreigners who do not understand Dutch, the vernacular of the other two churches in the neighbourhood) and the Protestant church has Dutch, Africans and some East Europeans among its worshippers. However, in the summer of 2008, the Anglican church moved to a chapel in the neighbouring Theresianenstraat, just outside the Holy Corner, to return in January 2016. At the end of 2015, to offset a big drop in attendance at Roman Catholic churches in Ghent, the Roman Catholic Bishop of Ghent had disaffected a number of Roman Catholic church buildings. The Saint Elisabeth church building was then taken over by the Anglican community, which had in the meantime outgrown its location in the Theresianenstraat. The first fully Anglican church service of the "Saint Elisabeth’s Anglican Church (the Parish of St. John’s)" took place on Sunday, January 24th 2016 (after an ecumenical one on the 17th).

See also 
Holy Corner in Edinburgh.

References

External links 
Saint Elisabeth Group Website
the old Saint Elisabeth page (in Dutch) on the website of the Roman Catholic Church in Ghent
Orthodox St Andrew Church Website (in Dutch)
Protestant Rabot church website (in Dutch)
Saint Elisabeth’s Anglican Church (the Parish of St. John’s) website

Buildings and structures in Ghent
Beguinages